Jean-Marie Raoul (1766–1837) was a French crown lawyer and Justice at the Paris Cour de Cassation, as well as a musician and an enthusiastic friend of art. He cultivated the violoncello, on which he distinguished himself. Raoul composed also some sonatas and "Airs variés" for his favorite instrument. However, his efforts, supported by Jean-Baptiste Vuillaume, the well-known Parisian luthier, to restore the gamba to practical use were in vain.

Biography
Raoul was born in Paris, in 1766. His sister, Fanny Raoul, was a feminist writer, journalist, philosopher and essayist.

His official position was crown lawyer and, later, as Justice at the Paris Cour de Cassation.

He wrote a tutorial (Op. 4), . He composed also three sonatas (Paris, Pleyel) and airs variés for his instrument. Interesting were his endeavours to reinstate the viol da gamba, which he played himself. He was in possession of the famous gamba, by Gasparo Duiffopruggar, made in 1521 for Francis I. The back of the instrument showed a bird's eye view of Paris, inlaid in coloured wood. After Raoul's death, the instrument passed into the hands of Vuillaume, to form one of the greatest acquisitions of the museum of the Royal Conservatory of Brussels. Raoul conceived the idea of having a gamba made which should come nearer the violoncello in proportion, and Vuillaume made one on a new model in 1827, exhibited in the same year as the "Heptachord". The popular verdict was, however, not in favour of this revival of the gamba, which had not been heard of again until the early 20th century, when several musicians showed a renewed interest in historical instruments.

Raoul died in Paris, 1837.

Notes

References

1766 births
1837 deaths
19th-century French lawyers
19th-century French musicians
19th-century French composers
French cellists
People from Paris